Flines Abbey (also L'Honneur Notre-Dame de Flines) was a Cistercian nunnery in Flines-lez-Raches near Douai, in the Nord department of France. It was founded in about 1234 by Countess Margaret of Flanders, and served as the burial place not only of Margaret in 1278 but of Margaret's husband William II of Dampierre (body transferred to Saint-Dizier in 1257) and their son Guy, Count of Flanders (1304), as well as of Guy's wives Matilda of Béthune (1263) and Isabelle of Luxembourg (1298).

The abbey owned farms in Faumont, Nomain, Coutiches, Cantin, Lambersart and Howardries (Belgium). It was destroyed in the French Revolution; the last remains disappeared in the middle of the 19th century.

References

Further reading 
Bernadette Barrière and Marie-Elisabeth Montulet-Henneau (eds.), 2001: Cîteaux et les femmes. Architectures et occupation de l'espace dans les monastères féminins. Modalités d'intégration et de contrôle des femmes dans l'Ordre. Les moniales cisterciennes aujourd'hui. Créaphis éditions: Grâne (transactions of a colloquium in 1998)
Cistercian Sites in Europe, 2012: Charte Européenne des Abbayes et Sites Cisterciens, p. 62

External links 
 AmisdesGeants.org: Destruction de l'Abbaye de Flines 
 Monique Hennebaut: Vauban et l'Abbaye de Flines 
 Monique Hennebaut: La Mer de Flines et l'Abbaye 
I Cistercensi: Flines
Cister.net: Flines

Cistercian nunneries in France
Buildings and structures in Nord (French department)
Burial sites of the House of Dampierre